Crime Against Joe is a 1956 American film noir  crime film directed by Lee Sholem and written by Robert C. Dennis. The film stars John Bromfield, Julie London, Henry Calvin, Patricia Blair, Joel Ashley and Robert Keys.

Plot
A Korean War veteran is accused of the murder of a night club singer in Tucson, Arizona.  A high school pin was found on the scene of the crime and the veteran's pin is missing. However, when the crime was committed, the veteran was leading a female somnambulist to her home but her over-protective father gives a false testimony to the district attorney. "Slacks", a female friend, gives him a false alibi but the police soon sort that out. The veteran thinks that one of his fellow high school students from 1945 was the murderer. He has got possible suspects on a list. Is the murderer among them?

Cast 
John Bromfield as Joe Manning
Julie London as Frances 'Slacks' Bennett
Henry Calvin as Red Waller
Patricia Blair as Christine 'Christy' Rowen
Joel Ashley as Philip Rowen
Robert Keys as Detective Sgt. Hollander
Alika Louis as Irene Crescent
John Pickard as Harry Dorn
Frances Morris as Nora Manning
Rhodes Reason as George Niles
Mauritz Hugo as Dr. Louis Tatreau 
Joyce Jameson as Gloria Wayne
Morgan Jones as Luther Woods
James Parnell as Ralph Corey
Addison Richards as District Attorney Roy Kasden

References

External links 
 

1956 films
United Artists films
American crime films
1956 crime films
Films directed by Lee Sholem
Films scored by Paul Dunlap
American black-and-white films
1950s English-language films
1950s American films